al-Lat, also spelled Allat, Allatu and Alilat, is a pre-Islamic Arabian goddess worshipped under various associations throughout the entire Arabian Peninsula, including Mecca where she was worshipped alongside Manat and al-'Uzza as one of the daughters of Allah. The word Allat or Elat has been used to refer to various goddesses in the ancient Near East, including the goddess Asherah-Athirat. 

Al-Lat is attested in south Arabian inscriptions as Lat and Latan, but she had more prominence in north Arabia and the Hejaz, and her cult reached as far as Syria. The writers of the Safaitic script frequently invoked al-Lat in their inscriptions. She was also worshipped by the Nabataeans and was associated with al-'Uzza. The presence of her cult was attested in both Palmyra and Hatra. Under Greco-Roman influence, her iconography began to show the attributes of Athena, the Greek goddess of war, as well as her Roman equivalent Minerva.  

According to Islamic sources, the tribe of Banu Thaqif in Ta'if especially held reverence to her. In Islamic tradition, her worship ended when her temple in Ta'if was demolished on the orders of Muhammad.

Etymology and name 
There are two possible etymologies of the name al-Lat. Medieval Arab lexicographers derived the name from the verb latta (to mix or knead barley-meal). It has also been associated with the "idol of jealousy" erected in the temple of Jerusalem according to the Book of Ezekiel, which was offered an oblation of barley-meal by the husband who suspected his wife of infidelity. It can be inferred from al-Kalbi's Book of Idols that a similar ritual was practiced in the vicinity of the image of al-Lat. Etymology takes al-Lat to be the feminine form of Allah. She may have been known originally as ʿal-ʿilat, based on Herodotus' attestation of the goddess as Alilat. 

Al-Lat was used as a title for the goddess Asherah or Athirat. The word is akin to Elat, which was the name of the wife of the Semitic deity El. A western Semitic goddess modeled on the Mesopotamian goddess Ereshkigal was known as Allatum, and she was recognized in Carthage as Allatu.

The goddess Allat's name is recorded as:
  in Imperial Aramaic;
  in Nabataean Arabic;
  in Palmyrene Aramaic;
  in Dadanitic;
  in Thamudic;
  in Ancient Greek;
   in Classical Arabic.

Attestations

Pre-Islamic era 
Al-Lat was mentioned as Alilat by the Greek historian Herodotus in his 5th-century BC work Histories, and she was considered the equivalent of Aphrodite (Aphrodite Urania):
According to Herodotus, the ancient Arabians believed in only two gods:

Al-Lat was widely worshipped in north Arabia, but in South Arabia she was not popular and was not the object of an organized cult, with two amulets (inscribed "Lat" on one, "Latan" on the other) being the only indication that this goddess received worship in the area. However, she seems to have been popular among the Arab tribes bordering Yemen. She was also attested in eastern Arabia; the name Taymallat (a theophoric name invoking the goddess) was attested as the name of a man from Gerrha, a city located in the region.

From Safaitic and Hismaic inscriptions, it is probable that she was worshipped as Lat (lt). In Safaitic inscriptions, al-Lat was invoked for solitude and mercy, as well as to provide well-being, ease and prosperity. Travelers would invoke her for good weather and protection. She was also invoked for vengeance, booty from raids, and infliction of blindness and lameness to anyone who defaces their inscriptions. 

The Qedarites, a northern Arabian tribal confederation, seemed to have also worshipped al-Lat, as evidenced by a silver bowl dedicated by a Qedarite king, with the goddess' name inscribed on it.

The Nabataeans and the people of Hatra also worshipped al-Lat, equating her with the Greek goddesses Athena and Tyche and the Roman goddess Minerva. She is frequently called "the Great Goddess" in Greek in multilingual inscriptions. The Nabataeans regarded al-Lat as the mother of the deities, and her family relations vary; sometimes she is regarded as the consort of Dushara and at other times as the mother of Dushara. Nabataean inscriptions call her and al-'Uzza the "brides of Dushara". 

A temple was built for al-Lat in Iram of the Pillars, by the tribe of ʿĀd. Al-Lat was referred to as "the goddess who is in Iram" in a Nabataean inscription. She was also referred to as "the goddess who is in Bosra". Perhaps a local Hijazi form of her attested in Hegra alongside Dushara and Manat was "Allat of 'Amnad".

Al-Lat was closely related to al-'Uzza, and in some regions of the Nabataean kingdom, both al-Lat and al-'Uzza were said to be the same goddess. John F. Healey believes that al-Lat and al-'Uzza originated as a single goddess, which parted ways in the pre-Islamic Meccan tradition. Susan Krone suggests that both al-Lat and al-'Uzza were uniquely fused in central Arabia.

Al-Lat was also venerated in Palmyra, where she was known as the "Lady of the temple". According to an inscription, she was brought into the Arab quarter of the city by a member of the Bene Ma'zin tribe, who were probably an Arab tribe. She had a temple in the city, which Teixidor believed to be the cultic center of Palmyrene Arab tribes. The practice of casting divination arrows, a common divination method in Arabia, was attested in her temple; an honorific inscription mentioning "a basin of silver for [casting] lots (lḥlq)".

By the second-century AD, al-Lat in Palmyra began to be portrayed in the style of Athena, and was referred to as "Athena-Allāt", but this assimilation does not extend beyond her iconography. The Palmyrene emperor Vaballathus, whose name is the Latinized form of the theophoric name Wahballāt ("Gift of al-Lat"), began to use Athenodorus as the Greek form of his name.

Islamic tradition 
In Islamic sources discussing pre-Islamic Arabia, al-Lat is attested as the chief goddess of the Banu Thaqif tribe. She was said to be venerated in Ta'if, where she was called ar-Rabba ("The Lady"), and she reportedly had a shrine there which was decorated with ornaments and treasure of gold and onyx. There, the goddess was venerated in the form of a cubic granite rock. The area around the shrine was considered sacred; no trees could be felled, no animal could be hunted and no human blood could be shed.

According to al-Kalbi's Book of Idols, her shrine was under the guardianship of the Banū Attāb ibn Mālik of the Banu Thaqif. She was also venerated by other Arab tribes, including the Quraysh, and their children would be named after the goddess, such as Zayd al-Lat and Taym al-Lat.

Al-Lat is also mentioned in pre-Islamic Arab poetry, such as in al-Mutalammis' satire of Amr ibn Hind:

A poem by the pre-Islamic monotheist Zayd ibn Amr mentions al-Lat, along with al-'Uzza and Hubal:

Al-Lat was also called as a daughter of Allah along with the other two chief goddesses al-'Uzza and Manat. According to the Book of Idols, the Quraysh were to chant the following verses as they circumambulated the Kaaba:

The word gharaniq was translated as "most exalted females" by Faris in his English translation of the Book of Idols, but he annotates this term in a footnote as "lit. Numidean cranes".

According to Islamic tradition, the shrine dedicated to al-Lat in Ta'if was demolished on the orders of Muhammad, during the Expedition of Abu Sufyan ibn Harb, in the same year as the Battle of Tabuk (which occurred in October 630 AD). The destruction of the cult image was a demand by Muhammad before he would allow any reconciliation to take place with the tribes of Ta'if, who were under his siege. According to the Book of Idols, this occurred after the Banu Thaqif converted to Islam, and that her temple was "burnt to the ground".

Quran and Satanic Verses incident 

In the Quran, she is mentioned along with al-‘Uzza and Manat in Quran 53:19–22, which became the subject of the alleged Satanic Verses incident, an occasion on which the Islamic prophet Muhammad had mistaken the words of "satanic suggestion" for divine revelation. Many different versions of the story existed (all traceable to one single narrator Muhammad ibn Ka'b, who was two generations removed from biographer Ibn Ishaq). In its essential form, the story reports that during Muhammad's recitation of Surat An-Najm, when he reached the following verses:

Satan tempted him to utter the following line:
Following this, the angel Gabriel chastised Muhammad for uttering that line, and the verses were abrogated with a new revelation:

The majority of Muslim scholars have rejected the historicity of the incident on the basis of the theological doctrine of 'isma (prophetic infallibility i.e., divine protection of Muhammad from mistakes) and their weak isnads (chains of transmission). Due to its defective chain of narration, the tradition of the Satanic Verses never made it into any of the canonical hadith compilations, though reference and exegesis about the Verses appear in early histories, such as al-Tabari's Tārīkh ar-Rusul wal-Mulūk and Ibn Ishaq's Sīrat Rasūl Allāh (as reconstructed by Alfred Guillaume).

The "Grinder" legend 
Various legends about her origins were known in medieval Islamic tradition, including one which linked al-Lat's stone with a man who grinds cereal (al-latt, "the grinder"). The stone was used as a base for the man (a Jew) to grind cereal for the pilgrims of Mecca. While most versions of this legend place the man at Ta'if, other versions place him at either Mecca or 'Ukaz. After the man's death, the stone, or the man in the form of a stone, was deified, according to some legends after the Khuza'a drove the Jurhum out of Mecca, while other legends report it was Amr ibn Luhayy who deified the grinder. 

Michael Cook noticed the oddity of this story, as it would make al-Lat masculine. Gerald Hawting believes the various legends that link al-Lat with that of al-latt, "the grinder", was an attempt to relate al-Lat with Mecca. He also compared the legends to Isaf and Na'ila, who according to legend were a man and a woman who fornicated inside the Kaaba and were petrified.

Mythological role 
F. V. Winnet saw al-Lat as a lunar deity due to association of a crescent with her in 'Ayn esh-Shallāleh and a Lihyanite inscription mentioning the name of Wadd over the title of 'fkl lt. René Dussaud and Gonzague Ryckmans linked her with Venus, while others have thought her to be a solar deity. John F. Healey considers al-Uzza actually might have been an epithet of al-Lat before becoming a separate deity in the Meccan pantheon. Redefining Dionysos considers she might have been a god of vegetation or a celestial deity of atmospheric phenomena and a sky deity. According to Wellhausen, the Nabataeans believed al-Lat was the mother of Hubal (and hence the mother-in-law of Manāt).

It has been hypothesized that Allah was the consort of al-Lat, given that it is typical of deities in that area of the world to have consorts.

Iconography 
In Ta'if, al-Lat's primary cult image was a cubic stone, sometimes described as white in color. Waqidi's mention of the 'head' (ra's) of ar-Rabba may imply that the image was perceived in human or animal form, although Julius Wellhausen resisted this implication.

Early Palmyrene depictions of al-Lat share iconographical traits with Atargatis (when seated) and Astarte (when standing). The Lion of Al-Lat that once adorned her temple depicts a lion and a gazelle, the lion representing her consort, and the gazelle representing al-Lat's tender and loving traits, as bloodshed was not permitted under penalty of al-Lat's retaliation.

Al-Lat was associated with the Greek goddess Athena (and by extension, the Roman Minerva) in Nabataea, Hatra and Palmyra. It seems that her identification with Athena was only a mere change in iconography, and al-Lat's character noticeably softened the warlike Athena in places where she was equated with al-Lat. One Nabataean relief of Athena-al-Lat depicts the goddess bearing both Athena and al-Lat's attributes. The relief depicts the goddess in the style of Athena, but having a Nabataean religion stylized eye-betyl in place of the Gorgoneion.

Al-Lat can also be identified with the Babylonian goddess Ishtar, with both of the deities taking part in prosperity, warfare, and later being linked to Aphrodite and Athena. The two's similarities also appeared in their symbols, as both were associated with lions, morning star and crescents. Like Al-Lat, Ishtar's origin was of Semitic roots.

Modern relevance 
The Lion of Al-Lat statue that adorned her temple in Palmyra was damaged by the Islamic State of Iraq and the Levant (ISIL) in 2015 but has been since restored. It now stands in the National Museum of Damascus, but it may be returned to Palmyra in the future.

See also 
 Banu Thaqif
 Hubal
 List of pre-Islamic Arabian deities
 Manāt
 Satanic Verses

Explanatory notes

References

Citations

General and cited sources

External links

Al-Lat
Arabian goddesses